The Communist Party of Greece, Interior, usually abbreviated as KKE Interior (Greek: ΚΚΕ Εσωτερικού), was a Eurocommunist party existing between 1968 and 1987 in Greece.

The party was formed after the Communist Party of Greece (KKE) suffered a major split following the 1968 Warsaw Pact invasion of Czechoslovakia and the suppression of the Prague Spring. KKE Interior essentially broke ties with KKE's ideological supervision by the Communist Party of the Soviet Union and later established bonds with parties such as the Italian Communist Party (PCI), adopting a Eurocommunist perspective.

KKE Interior was greatly active in the struggle against the Regime of the Colonels that ruled Greece from 1967 to 1974 through the Panhellenic Antidictatorial Front (abbrev. ΠΑΜ) and its youth wing, the Greek Communist Youth – Rigas Feraios. During the period that followed the overturn of the Regime of the Colonels, known as the Metapolitefsi, the party remained electorally active, either on its own or in broader leftist coalitions. KKE Interior was dissolved some months after its 4th Congress in 1986, splitting into two: the Communist Party of Greece (Interior)-Renewing Left and the Greek Left. Through different routes, both would end up part of the Coalition of the Radical Left (SYRIZA).

Notable members

 Euclid Tsakalotos

Electoral results

References

Defunct communist parties in Greece
Resistance to the Greek junta
Political parties established in 1968
Political parties disestablished in 1987